The Silver Swan is a fictional character appearing in DC Comics publications and related media, commonly as a recurring adversary of the superhero Wonder Woman. Capable of flight and possessing the superhuman ability to generate a devastating sonic cry, she first appeared in 1982 in Wonder Woman #288, written by Roy Thomas and illustrated by Gene Colan. Since then, the character has undergone several updates as comic book continuities have evolved and shifted. Indeed, there have been three different Silver Swans since the character's debut, including Helen Alexandros, the original Silver Swan; Valerie Beaudry, the second Silver Swan, debuting in 1988 in Wonder Woman (vol. 2) #15; and Vanessa Kapatelis, the third and current Silver Swan, debuting in 2001 in Wonder Woman (vol. 2) #171. The backstories of all three characters are inspired by Hans Christian Andersen's fairy tale The Ugly Duckling: Alexandros, Beaudry and Kapetelis all believe in different ways that they are undesirable, unattractive or unwanted, only to find themselves transformed into extraordinarily beautiful (and vengeful) super-powered women.

Fictional character biography

Helen Alexandros

Born to Leda Alexandros, Helen Alexandros is a bitter ballet dancer who, disgusted by being overlooked and cruelly treated because of her homely appearance, struck a bargain with Mars to have a beautiful face and body in return for destroying man's champion, Wonder Woman. Helen becomes the mystically-created alter ego Silver Swan in the Pre-Crisis universe.

Diana Prince comes upon a gang of bank robbers, and a new arrival, a flying, costumed female who calls herself the Silver Swan, helps her bring them in. The Silver Swan flies off, and Wonder Woman discovers that the briefcase of secret documents she and Steve Trevor had been carrying is gone. Later, Diana and Etta Candy discover a rent raise has made it necessary for them to take on a new roommate. The first applicant, whom they accept, is Helen Alexandros, who has found the briefcase and returns it to Diana.

Unknown to both of them, the plain-faced, skin-blemished Helen is a former ballerina who has been badly hurt by rejections due to her "ugly duckling" face. After one performance in an ancient temple in Greece, Helen cried out to the gods that she hated men. At that point, Mars appeared from Mount Olympus and revealed to Helena that she was a descendant on her mother's side from Helen of Sparta, daughter of Zeus and Leda. When Mars asked if she was ready to accept her "heritage of blood", Helen agreed, and was transformed into the beautiful Silver Swan, with the powers of flight, great strength, and a "swan song" which could wreak destruction. Mars told the Swan that Helen would be able to change into her for an hour at a time, as long as she served him, and on the day that she destroyed Wonder Woman, she would become the Silver Swan forever.

Later, when Wonder Woman is attempting to return the briefcase, the Silver Swan snatches it away and defeats the Amazon in battle. But, unwilling to destroy Wonder Woman around witnesses, the Swan turns over the briefcase and convinces Gen. Darnell that she mistakenly thought Wonder Woman was stealing it. Meanwhile, Doctor Psycho is able to use Steve Trevor to produce enough ectoplasm to turn him into Captain Wonder, in which identity he attacks Wonder Woman, and helps the Swan rope in Wonder Woman. Captain Wonder and Silver Swan fall in love with each other at first sight. They opt to take the captive heroine to the White House and kill her before the eyes of President of the United States Ronald Reagan. Mars appears to the Swan and demands that she order Captain Wonder to send the Robot Plane crashing into the White House and thus murder the President.

Steve Trevor awakens from Dr. Psycho's spell and is able to break Psycho's ability to maintain his Captain Wonder persona. Psycho crashes to Earth unharmed and Wonder Woman is able to break free. Wonder Woman battles the Silver Swan and defeats her, and the Amazon manages to prevent her plane from smashing the White House and endangering President Reagan. Disappointed in the Swan, Mars withdraws her powers and she returns to her Helen Alexandros identity, after which she disappears.

The Silver Swan reappeared in a battle arranged behind the scenes by the Monitor as one of the tests he launched to prepare for the coming multiversal crisis. The Swan appeared late one night in a Pentagon storage facility, encountering the Angle Man, Captain Wonder, and the Cheetah. They were defeated when Etta Candy used Doctor Psycho's ectoplasmitron to create for herself a superpowered identity based on Wonder Woman.

Valerie Beaudry

In the Post-Crisis continuity, Valerie Beaudry was exposed to radiation from nuclear tests while in the womb. This caused her to be horribly deformed. Valerie comes under the influence of a man named Henry Cobb Armbruster. The head of Armbruster International, he exploited Valerie's need for acceptance by choosing her for his Silver Swan project. Valerie was mutated to become the Silver Swan, granting her incredible beauty as well as tremendous hypersonic powers. He extended his control over Valerie by marrying her. He also used her to battle Wonder Woman and Ed Indelicato. Eventually, thanks to Diana and her pen pal, Maxine Sterenbuch, who had formed a true friendship with her over the years, Valerie saw Armbruster for who he truly was and divorced him.

Valerie, wanting to repay Diana for helping her, offered her assistance during her time as a fugitive during War of the Gods. Diana refused however, not wanting Valerie to be put in harm's way, despite her incredible power. Nevertheless, she joined many of Earth's heroes in the battle against Circe. She later joined a short-lived superteam known as the Captains of Industry. Eventually, Valerie retired her identity as the Silver Swan, but not before serving a stint in the Suicide Squad. She also appeared in Underworld Unleashed as one of many characters whom the demon Neron approached to exchange their souls to him for enhanced power. She rejected his offer, opting instead for a quiet life in suburbia, not far from her good friend Maxine.

Some time later, Valerie returned to the Silver Swan role against her will after reality was altered during JLA/Avengers. She appeared as part of a team of villains sent to attack the assembled heroes, but was quickly defeated by the Vision. Valerie was last seen standing in an energy bubble, bound and gagged with restraints conjured by the briefly resurrected Hal Jordan. After reality was restored at the event's conclusion, Valerie presumably returned to her peaceful civilian life.

Vanessa Kapatelis

Julia Kapatelis became pregnant while she and her husband, David Kapatelis, were exploring Scotland. As a joke, David wanted to name their unborn child "Nessie" after the local Scottish creature the Loch Ness Monster. Though amused, Julia did not agree but settled on Vanessa as a close substitute. Julia remained married to David until his death 22 years into their marriage, when Vanessa was 5 years old, while exploring ruins in Egypt. Deciding to make a fresh start, Julia took Vanessa to live in the U.S. where she eventually became the Dean for the Department of History and Geology at Harvard University.

While living on Beacon Hill in Boston, Massachusetts, Vanessa grew up feeling like an awkward outsider in high school. During this time. she had the chance to meet Wonder Woman when her mother took in the Amazon when she first arrived in the United States. At first, Vanessa was jealous of Wonder Woman's beauty, but after Diana rescued her from Decay, the two got to know each other better. Nessie started to love Wonder Woman as an elder sister and dreamed of fighting evil alongside her.

The trauma of her father's death and the suicide of her best friend, Lucy, made Vanessa start to blame herself for all the bad things that happened to people she cared about. Meanwhile, Doctor Psycho started to cause her to have nightmares. To help her daughter recover, the school counselor (under Psycho's influence) told Julia that Diana had to leave their house.

Vanessa eventually recovered, but she could not forgive her mother for making Diana leave. She started to blame Diana for abandoning her. During this time, Vanessa became a target for Wonder Woman's enemies yet again by being kidnapped by the White Magician. She was eventually rescued by Diana. Her mixed emotions were a perfect target for Circe who decided to use her to get to Diana. Thus, using Sebastian Ballesteros (the latest Cheetah) as a lure, Dr. Psycho and Circe used periodic mental conditioning and physical implants to gradually transform Vanessa into a new Silver Swan and set her against her former friend. They programmed Vanessa's brain and turned the young woman into a killing machine, unleashing her upon Diana and Wonder Girl, who she considered a usurper of her "entitled" role. The result of this brought about the destruction of Cassie Sandmark's school and the death of over a hundred people as well as exposing Cassie's identity. Vanessa had become, effectively, a terrorist, but before Diana could attempt any resolution, the Imperiex attack and Circe's takeover of New York City occurred.

After Circe was defeated, Diana took Vanessa to a hospital in Buenos Aires where she could heal. While she was recovering, Ballesteros abducted her. Veronica Cale, who hated and envied Diana, bought Nessie from him and transformed her further into a cyborg, sending her back to fight Diana. When Diana defeated Vanessa she begged Doctor Leslie Anderson to operate on her and remove the cyborg implants. Diana then sent Vanessa to Themyscira for surgical recovery.

A Silver Swan was present in Salvation Run among the other exiled villains and was seen in Final Crisis as a victim of the Anti-Life Equation. Later, she appears in a grouping of Wonder Woman's adversaries, all gathered by Circe. The villains are defeated. Later, they are taken into custody by the Department of Metahuman Affairs. It appears this may be a new incarnation of the Silver Swan as Vanessa has made a complete physical and mental recovery and has recently graduated from college, with her mother, Steve Trevor, Etta Candy, Vanessa's uncle Stavros and Diana herself all in attendance at the ceremony.

DC Rebirth
After the events of DC Rebirth, the Silver Swan's history was altered. Vanessa Kapatelis was a young woman who Wonder Woman rescued after a battle with Major Disaster. However, during the battle, Vanessa was partially buried under rubble. When paramedics took Vanessa to the hospital, it was revealed that Vanessa had lost the ability to walk. Throughout the next few months, Wonder Woman kept Vanessa company in the hospital alongside Vanessa's mother Julia. Vanessa and Wonder Woman grew closer to the point that Vanessa considered herself the superheroine's best friend.

Vanessa was later approached by doctors about participating in a unique procedure involving nanites that they had learned about from Cyborg. This procedure enabled Vanessa to walk again. Wonder Woman soon visited Vanessa less and less, and when her mother died in a strange car accident, Vanessa thought she had nobody left. This drove her to madness, her nanites donning a cybernetic costume and calling herself the Silver Swan, based on a fictional superhero she had created to help Wonder Woman.

After receiving a distress call from a family that she had saved earlier, Wonder Woman traveled to their house only to find the Silver Swan standing over their corpses. Silver Swan then began relentlessly attacking Wonder Woman and her brother, Jason, who joined the fight. Though she proves to be a formidable foe, Diana succeeded in defeating her by causing her to run out of breath from using her sonic scream, forcing her to revert to Vanessa. Her comatose body was placed in the care of S.T.A.R. Labs in a cell designed to hold her in case she transforms. Vanessa is overseen by Doctor Psycho posing as a S.T.A.R. Labs scientist.

Powers, abilities, and weapons
Each Silver Swan has the ability to create powerful sound waves with her voice. Their "swan songs" are capable of devastating a small area of land with their destructive force. By creating a low-level humming, the Silver Swan can form a protective shield around herself that can deflect bullets and projectiles.

Unlike the Pre-Crisis version, whose abilities were acquired supernaturally through the god Mars, the two Post-Crisis Silver Swans need their artificial wings to control their flight motion.

Each version also possesses an additional ability which makes her unique from the other Silver Swans.

Helen Alexandros has superhuman strength. It was speculated that Valerie Beaudry had the ability to rearrange matter with her voice (but she never had a chance to be trained in doing so). Vanessa Kapatelis has sharpened nails and the telepathic ability to control birds.

In the DC Rebirth continuity, Vanessa's powers stem from an experimental nanite treatment she received that was supposed to allow her to walk again. Once her mind snaps, the nanites alter her physiology and transform her into the Silver Swan, a cybernetic alter ego.

In this form Vanessa can easily match Wonder Woman in a fight and is equipped with a pair of bionic wings which allow her to fly or use their razor sharp edges to slice through targets. She can also project devastating sonic blasts with her voice and has knife edged claws at the ends of her fingertips. The post-Rebirth iterations Nanites can also be used to hack any and every computerized mainframe in the world, Diana commenting her technological interfacing potentially could rival Cyborg of the Justice League.

Other versions

JLA/Avengers
Silver Swan appeared in the JLA/Avengers miniseries as a villain under Krona's control. She attacked the Vision and helped take him down with her magic attacks. After other heroes intervened, the Vision phased his arm through her chest, defeating her. She is then shown bound and gagged by Green Lantern in an emerald energy cell with the other villains, save Sonar who is caught in Wonder Woman's lasso.

Flashpoint
In the Flashpoint universe, Silver Swan joined with the Amazons' Furies.

Sensational Wonder Woman
In the digital-first anthology series Sensational Wonder Woman, Silver Swan appears in the story "The Queen's Hive", where she, Blue Snowman, Doctor Poison, and Giganta serve as Queen Bee's generals.

In other media
 The Vanessa Kapatelis incarnation of Silver Swan appears in Wonder Woman: Bloodlines, voiced by Marie Avgeropoulos. Initially a bright yet snarky young woman, this version experienced friction with her mother, Julia, which was worsened by Vanessa's jealousy towards Wonder Woman, who came to live in the Kapatelis household. After Veronica Cale secretly kills Julia, a grieving Vanessa blames Wonder Woman before she is approached by Villainy Inc., who outfit her with techno-organic augmentations and transform her into Silver Swan so she can get revenge in exchange for helping them resurrect Medusa. When the Gorgon subsequently betrays the group, Vanessa defects to Wonder Woman's side to help her kill Medusa and reconciles with her.
 The Vanessa Kapatelis incarnation of Silver Swan appears as an assist character in Scribblenauts Unmasked: A DC Comics Adventure.
 An unidentified incarnation of Silver Swan appears in Wonder Woman '77 as the lead singer of a band called "Silver Swan and the Starlings".

See also
 List of Wonder Woman enemies

References

External links
Helen Alexandros:
 The Unofficial Silver Swan I Biography
 Wonder Woman #288 (First Appearance)

Valerie Beaudry:
 Amazing Amazons Profile
 Silver Swan Rapsheet
 The Unofficial Silver Swan II Biography

Vanessa Kapatelis:
 Amazing Amazons Profile
 The Unofficial Vanessa Kapatelis Biography

Articles about multiple fictional characters
Comics characters introduced in 1982
DC Comics characters with superhuman strength
DC Comics female supervillains
Wonder Woman characters
Fictional characters from Boston
Fictional characters who can manipulate sound
DC Comics cyborgs
Fictional technopaths
Fictional Greek people
Characters created by George Pérez